Snowden is a surname. Notable people with the surname include:
 A. Loudon Snowden (1835–1912), U.S. ambassador to Spain 1892–1893
 Andrew Snowden (elected 2021), British Police and Crime Commissioner
 Cal Snowden (born 1946), former American football player
 Charles Snowden (born 1998), American football player
 Christopher Snowden  (born 1956), English engineer, academic and executive
 Dave Snowden (born 1954), knowledge management consultant and researcher
 Edward Snowden (born 1983), American-Russian whistleblower who disclosed U.S. National Security Agency's mass surveillance programs
 Elmer Snowden (1900–1973), American jazz musician
 Ethel Snowden (1881–1951), British socialist and feminist politician
 George Holburn Snowden (1901–1990), American sculptor
 George Snowden (1904–1982), American dancer
 Gilda Snowden (1954–2014), African American artist from Detroit
 Grant Snowden, American policeman and criminal defendant 
 James Ross Snowden  (1809–1878), Treasurer and Director of the U.S. Mint
 Jeffrey Snowden (born 1973), English cricketer
 John M. Snowden (1776–1845), Mayor of Pittsburgh, Pennsylvania, 1825–1828 
 John Snowden (sport shooter), New Zealand sport shooter
 Kade Snowden (born 1986), Australian rugby league footballer
 Leigh Snowden (1929–1982), an American actress in motion pictures and television
 M.L. Snowden, American sculptor
 Philip Snowden, 1st Viscount Snowden (1864–1937), British Labour Party politician
 Richard Snowden (ironmaster) (1640–1711), founder of Maryland's first iron works near present-day Laurel Maryland
 Sylvia Snowden, African American abstract painter
 Vivianna Olivia Snowden, (1840-1892) was a preacher and activist who went by the name Anna Oliver professionally

See also
 Snowden (character), a fictional character from the novel Catch-22 by Joseph Heller
 Snowden (disambiguation)
 Snowdon (disambiguation)
 Sowden, a surname

English-language surnames